In geometry, the Philo line is a line segment defined from an angle and a point inside the angle as the shortest line segment through the point that has its endpoints on the two sides of the angle. Also known as the Philon line, it is named after Philo of Byzantium, a Greek writer on mechanical devices, who lived probably during the 1st or 2nd century BC.  Philo used the line to double the cube; because doubling the cube cannot be done by a straightedge and compass construction, neither can constructing the Philo line.

Geometric characterization

The defining point of a Philo line, and the base of a perpendicular from the apex of the angle to the line, are equidistant from the endpoints of the line.

Algebraic Construction 

The equation of a bundle of lines with inclinations  that
run through the point  is
 
These lines intersect the horizontal axis at
 
which has the solution
 

These lines intersect the opposite side  at
 
which has the solution
 

The squared Euclidean distance between the intersections of the horizontal line
and the diagonal is
 

The Philo Line is defined by the minimum of that distance at
negative .

An arithmetic expression for the location of the minimum
is obtained by setting the derivative ,
so
 
So calculating the root of the polynomial in the numerator,
 
determines the slope of the particular line in the line bundle which has the shortest length.
[The global minimum at inclination  from the root of the other factor is not of interest; it does not define a triangle but means

 is the tangent of the angle .

one  finds that  is a root of the cubic polynomial
 
So solving that cubic equation finds the intersection of the Philo line on the horizontal axis.
Plugging in the same expression into the expression for the squared distance gives

Location of  
The coordinates of the point  are calculated by intersecting this line with the Philo line, .  yields
 
 
 .
 .
The difference of these two expressions is
 .

Special case: right angle 
The equation of a bundle of lines with inclination  that
If  form a right angle, the limit  of the previous section results
in the following special case:

These lines intersect the -axis at
 
which has the solution
 

The squared Euclidean distance between the intersections of the horizontal line and vertical lines
is
 

The Philo Line is defined by the minimum of that curve (at
negative ).
An arithmetic expression for the location of the minimum
is where  the derivative ,
so
 
equivalent  to
 
Therefore
 
one  finds

Doubling the cube 
The Philo line can be used to double the cube, that is, to construct a geometric representation of the cube root of two, and this was Philo's purpose in defining this line. Let  be the Philo line of point  with respect to right angle . Define point  to be the point of intersection of line  and of the circle through points .

Let  be the point where line  crosses a perpendicular line through . Combining these equalities and similarities gives the equality of proportions  or more concisely . Since the first and last terms of these three equal proportions are in the ratio , the proportions themselves must all be , the proportion that is required to double the cube.

Since doubling the cube is impossible with a straightedge and compass construction, it is similarly impossible to construct the Philo line with these tools.

Minimizing the area 

Given the point  and the angle , a variant of the problem may minimize the area of the triangle .
 .
Finding the slope  that minimizes the area means to set ,
 .
Again discarding the root  which does not define a triangle, the slope is in that
case 

and the minimum area
.

References

Further reading

External links 

Euclidean plane geometry